Marco Filippeschi (born 2 July 1960 in Fauglia) is an Italian politician.

Biography 
Filippeschi was elected with the Democrats of the Left at the 2001 Italian general election, serving as member of the Chamber of Deputies for two legislatures (XIV, XV). He has been a member of the Democratic Party since 2007.

He was elected Mayor of Pisa on 29 April 2008 and re-elected for a second term on 26 May 2013.

He served as President of the Province of Pisa from 14 October 2014 to 31 October 2018.

See also
2001 Italian general election
2006 Italian general election
2008 Italian local elections
2013 Italian local elections
List of mayors of Pisa

References

External links
 
 

1960 births
Living people
Mayors of Pisa
Democratic Party (Italy) politicians
Democrats of the Left politicians
Presidents of the Province of Pisa